The 2011–12 season of the Belgian Pro League (also known as Jupiler Pro League for sponsorship reasons) was the 109th season of top-tier football in Belgium. It began on 29 July 2011 with the first match of the regular season and ended in May 2012 with the last matches of the playoff rounds. The defending champions were Genk, who this time ended in third position, while the competition was won by Anderlecht, who clenched the title after a 1–1 draw against Club Brugge with two games left to play in the Championship Playoff.

Teams

Team changes
During the previous season, on 23 April 2011, Charleroi were relegated as a result of a 2–2 draw at home to Eupen in the relegation playoff, making it impossible to overtake them in the standings. This ended a spell of 26 consecutive seasons of being at the top level of Belgian football, with only Anderlecht, Club Brugge and Standard Liège being present for more years. As winner of the relegation playoff, Eupen avoided direct relegation, but was still forced to play the Second Division Final Round together with second division teams Lommel United, Waasland-Beveren and Mons for the final spot in first division. However, after losing four matches in a row, Eupen was also relegated on 19 May 2011 after just one season at the top level. In the final match between Mons and Waasland-Beveren, Mons eventually came out as winner of the final round and took the place of Eupen.

On 24 April 2011, just one day after the relegation of Charleroi, Oud-Heverlee Leuven was promoted after securing the title in the Second Division and as a result, the city of Leuven now has a first division team again for the first time in 61 years.

Stadia and locations

Personnel and sponsoring

Managerial changes

Regular season

League table

Positions by round
Note: The classification was made after the weekend (or midweek) of each matchday, so postponed matches were only processed at the time they were played to represent the real evolution in standings.

Only one match has been postponed during the season:
 On matchday 18: Cercle Brugge vs. Gent of 16 December because of a rain-drenched pitch, was played two days later on 18 December.

Results

Championship playoff
The points obtained during the regular season were halved (and rounded up) before the start of the playoff. As a result, the teams started with the following points before the playoff: Anderlecht 34 points, Club Brugge 31, Gent 28, Standard 26, Genk 23 and Kortrijk 23.

Playoff table

Positions by round
Below the positions per round are shown. As teams did not all start with an equal number of points, the initial pre-playoffs positions are also given.

Results

Europa League playoff
Group A contains the teams finishing the regular season in positions 7, 9, 12 and 14. The teams finishing in positions 8, 10, 11 and 13 were placed in Group B.

Group A

Group B

Europa League playoff final
The winners of both playoff groups competed in a two-legged match to play the fourth-placed team of the championship playoff, called Testmatch. The winners of this Testmatch were granted entry to the second qualifying round of the 2012–13 UEFA Europa League.

Cercle Brugge won 4–2 on aggregate.

Testmatches Europa League
Europa League playoff final winners Cercle Brugge competed with fourth placed team Gent for the final European ticket. After a 7-2 aggregate win, Gent qualified for the second qualifying round of the 2012–13 UEFA Europa League.

Gent won 7–2 on aggregate.

Relegation playoff
The teams finishing in the last two positions Westerlo and Sint-Truiden, faced each other in the relegation playoff. Westerlo started with a three-point bonus and home advantage for finishing above Sint-Truiden during the regular season. Although the teams were scheduled to play each other 5 times, Westerlo forced the decision already after four matches making the last match obsolete. Thereby, Sint-Truiden was relegated and Westerlo was allowed to play the relegation playoffs with the teams from the Second Division.

Top goalscorers
Source: sporza.be and Sport.be  ''

  Jesper Jørgensen (Gent)
  Bernd Thijs (Gent)
  Dalibor Veselinović (Kortrijk)
  Reza Ghoochannejhad (Sint-Truiden)
  Mohammed Tchité (Standard Liège)

  Chuka (OH Leuven)

  Milan Jovanović (Anderlecht)
  Ibrahima Sidibe (Beerschot (6)/Westerlo (3))
  Elyaniv Barda (Genk)
  Ernest Nfor (Kortrijk)

  Igor Vetokele (Cercle Brugge)
  Thomas Buffel (Genk)
  Kevin De Bruyne (Genk)
  Zlatan Ljubijankič (Gent)
  Steeven Joseph-Monrose (Kortrijk)
  Alessandro Cordaro (Mechelen)
  Ibou (Mons)
  Reynaldo (Westerlo)

  Sherjill MacDonald (Beerschot)
  Lukas Van Eenoo (Cercle Brugge)
  Elimane Coulibaly (Gent)
  Daylon Claasen (Lierse)
  Grégory Dufer (Sint-Truiden)

  Roei Dayan (Beerschot)
  Amido Baldé (Cercle Brugge)
  Maxime Lestienne (Club Brugge)
  Lior Refaelov (Club Brugge)
  Víctor Vázquez (Club Brugge)
  Björn Vleminckx (Club Brugge)
  Rémi Maréval (Gent (3)/Zulte Waregem (3))
  Mustapha Oussalah (Kortrijk)
  Mohamed El-Gabbas (Lierse)
  Boubacar Diabang (Mechelen)
  Rachid Bourabia (Mons)
  Giuseppe Rossini (Sint-Truiden (3)/Zulte Waregem (3))
  Michy Batshuayi (Standard Liège)
  Cyriac (Standard Liège)
  Mbaye Leye (Standard Liège (3)/Zulte Waregem (3))
  Jens Naessens (Zulte Waregem)

  Oleg Iachtchouk (Cercle Brugge)
  Tim Smolders (Gent)
  Pablo Chavarría (Kortrijk)
  Miloš Marić (Lierse)
  Baye Djiby Fall (Lokeren)
  David Destorme (Mechelen)
  Jaime Alfonso Ruiz (Mechelen)
  Jelle Van Damme (Standard Liège)
  Steven De Petter (Westerlo)
  Bart Goor (Westerlo)

  Roland Juhász (Anderlecht)
  Kanu (Anderlecht)
  Sacha Kljestan (Anderlecht)
  Gary Kagelmacher (Beerschot)
  Vuza Nyoni (Beerschot)
  Nabil Dirar (Club Brugge)
  Ryan Donk (Club Brugge)
  Vadis Odjidja-Ofoe (Club Brugge)
  Christian Brüls (Gent)
  Yassine El Ghanassy (Gent)
  Nill De Pauw (Lokeren)
  Mijat Marić (Lokeren)
  Bjorn Ruytinx (OH Leuven)
  Yoni Buyens (Standard Liège)
  Luis Manuel Seijas (Standard Liège)
  Shlomi Arbeitman (Westerlo)

  Tom De Sutter (Anderlecht)
  Patou Kabangu (Anderlecht)
  Marcin Wasilewski (Anderlecht)
  Guillaume François (Beerschot)
  Roni Porokara (Beerschot)
  Kristof D'haene (Cercle Brugge)
  Kevin Janssens (Cercle Brugge)
  Carlos Bacca (Club Brugge)
  Thomas Meunier (Club Brugge)
  Melli (Gent)
  Brecht Capon (Kortrijk)
  Péter Czvitkovics (Kortrijk)
  Nebojša Pavlović (Kortrijk)
  Ervin Zukanović (Kortrijk)
  Ibrahima Gueye (Lokeren)
  Benjamin Mokulu (Lokeren)
  Koen Persoons (Lokeren)
  Maël Lépicier (Mons)
  Thomas Azevedo (OH Leuven)
  Frederik Boi (OH Leuven)
  Karel Geraerts (OH Leuven)
  Sacha Iakovenko (OH Leuven)
  Grégory Christ (Sint-Truiden)
  Evariste Ngolok (Westerlo)
  Teddy Chevalier (Zulte Waregem)
  Davy De Fauw (Zulte Waregem)
  Jérémy Serwy (Zulte Waregem)
  Aleksandar Trajkovski (Zulte Waregem)

  Lucas Biglia (Anderlecht)
  Romelu Lukaku (Anderlecht)
  Anthony Portier (Cercle Brugge)
  Carl Hoefkens (Club Brugge)
  Fabien Camus (Genk)
  Jeroen Simaeys (Genk)
  Dániel Tőzsér (Genk)
  César Arzo (Gent)
  Yaya Soumahoro (Gent)
  Hannes van der Bruggen (Gent)
  Jason Adesanya (Lierse)
  Boban Grnčarov (Lierse)
  Wesley Sonck (Lierse)
  Ayanda Patosi (Lokeren)
  Katuku Tshimanga (Lokeren)
  Boris Pandža (Mechelen)
  Mustapha Jarju (Mons)
  Tim Matthys (Mons)
  Jérémy Sapina (Mons)
  Tom van Imschoot (Mons)
  Radek Dejmek (OH Leuven)
  Sascha Kotysch (Sint-Truiden)
  Dolly Menga (Sint-Truiden)
  Nils Schouterden (Sint-Truiden)
  Franck Berrier (Standard Liège (1)/Zulte Waregem (1))
  Felipe (Standard Liège)
  Ignacio María González (Standard Liège)
  Kanu (Standard Liège)
  Geoffrey Mujangi Bia (Standard Liège)
  Lens Annab (Westerlo)
  Dieter Dekelver (Westerlo)
  William Owusu (Westerlo)
  Jonathan Delaplace (Zulte Waregem)
  Habib Habibou (Zulte Waregem)
  Brian Hamalainen (Zulte Waregem)
  Thomas Matton (Zulte Waregem)

  Fernando Canesin (Anderlecht)
  Nathan Kabasele (Anderlecht)
  Arnor Angeli (Beerschot)
  Adnan Čustović (Beerschot)
  Wim De Decker (Beerschot)
  Conor Laerenbergh (Beerschot)
  Dor Malul (Beerschot)
  Tomislav Mikulić (Beerschot)
  Hans Cornelis (Cercle Brugge)
  Bernt Evens (Cercle Brugge)
  Gregory Mertens (Cercle Brugge)
  Renato Neto (Cercle Brugge)
  William Carvalho (Cercle Brugge)
  Jordi (Club Brugge)
  Mushaga Bakenga (Club Brugge)
  Niki Zimling (Club Brugge)
  David Hubert (Genk)
  Khaleem Hyland (Genk)
  Torben Joneleit (Genk)
  Anthony Limbombe (Genk)
  Nadson (Genk)
  Anthony Vanden Borre (Genk)
  Ibrahima Sory Conte (Gent)
  Mamoutou N'Diaye (Gent)
  Rafinha (Gent)
  Brecht Dejaeghere (Kortrijk)
  Gertjan De Mets (Kortrijk)
  Mohamed Messoudi (Kortrijk)
  David Vandenbroek (Kortrijk)
  Flávio Amado (Lierse)
  Cofie Bekoe (Lierse)
  Soufiane Bidaoui (Lierse)
  Kris De Wree (Lierse)
  Frédéric Frans (Lierse)
  Stein Huysegems (Lierse)
  Péter Kovács (Lierse)
  Barry Boubacar Copa (Lokeren)
  Laurens De Bock (Lokeren)
  Alfreð Finnbogason (Lokeren)
  Ivan Leko (Lokeren)
  Killian Overmeire (Lokeren)
  Jérémy Taravel (Lokeren)
  Maxime Biset (Mechelen)
  Seth De Witte (Mechelen)
  Abdul-Yakuni Iddi (Mechelen)
  Sérgio Oliveira (Mechelen)
  Wannes Van Tricht (Mechelen)
  Chris Makiese (Mons)
  Zola Matumona (Mons)
  Benjamin Nicaise (Mons)
  Nicolas Timmermans (Mons)
  Patrick Amoah (OH Leuven)
  Loris Brogno (OH Leuven)
  Emmerik De Vriese (OH Leuven)
  Nicky Hayen (OH Leuven)
  Stefan Gislason (OH Leuven)
  Pieter Nys (OH Leuven)
  Wim Raymaekers (OH Leuven)
  Kevin Roelandts (OH Leuven)
  Ludovic Buysens (Sint-Truiden)
  Koen Daerden (Sint-Truiden)
  Vincent Euvrard (Sint-Truiden)
  Alessandro Iandoli (Sint-Truiden)
  Pierre-Yves Ngawa (Sint-Truiden)
  Rubin Okotie (Sint-Truiden)
  Yannick Rymenants (Sint-Truiden)
  Imoh Ezekiel (Standard Liège)
  Serge Gakpé (Standard Liège)
  Réginal Goreux (Standard Liège)
  Aloys Nong (Standard Liège)
  Ellenton Liliu (Westerlo)
  Felix Luz (Westerlo)
  Marcão (Westerlo)
  Jeroen Vanthournout (Westerlo)
  Stef Wils (Westerlo)
  Juande (Westerlo)
  Miguel Dachelet (Zulte Waregem)
  Karel D'Haene (Zulte Waregem)
  Ólafur Ingi Skúlason (Zulte Waregem)

  Baptiste Martin (Kortrijk), scored for Mons and Genk)
  Tomislav Mikulić (Beerschot, scored for Genk and Mons)
  Denis Viane (Cercle Brugge, scored twice for Genk)

  Samuel (Anderlecht, scored for OH Leuven)
  Nuno Reis (Cercle Brugge, scored for Sint-Truiden)
  Tom Høgli (Club Brugge, scored for Mechelen)
  Alpha Bâ (Gent, scored for Westerlo)
  Elimane Coulibaly (Gent, scored for Genk)
  Alassane També (Kortrijk, scored for Lokeren)
  Kristof Van Hout (Kortrijk, scored for Club Brugge)
  Dalibor Veselinović (Kortrijk), scored for Gent)
  Boban Grnčarov (Lierse), scored for Cercle Brugge)
  Koen Persoons (Lokeren, scored for Mechelen)
  Wouter Biebauw (Mechelen, scored for Standard Liège)
  Xavier Chen (Mechelen, scored for Beerschot)
  Kenny van Hoevelen (Mechelen, scored for Beerschot)
  Kevin Roelandts (OH Leuven, scored for Club Brugge)
  Peter Delorge (Sint-Truiden, scored for Mons)
  Sascha Kotysch (Sint-Truiden, scored for Gent)
  Wim Mennes (Sint-Truiden, scored for Mons)
  Jelle Van Damme (Standard Liège, scored for OH Leuven)
  Wouter Corstjens (Westerlo, scored for Club Brugge)

See also
 List of Belgian football transfers summer 2011
 List of Belgian football transfers winter 2011–12

References

Belgian Pro League seasons
Belgian Pro League
1